Oxford Early Christian Texts is the name of a series of books published by Oxford University Press which contain texts from early Christian writers in both their original Latin and Greek and in translation.

List of books in the series

Early Christian Texts, Oxford
Publications of patristic texts